Jeremiah Ramiro Estrada (born November 1, 1998) is an American professional baseball pitcher for the Chicago Cubs of Major League Baseball (MLB).

Career
Estrada attended Palm Desert High School in Palm Desert, California. He was drafted by the Chicago Cubs in the sixth round of the 2017 Major League Baseball draft. He made his professional debut that year with the Arizona League Cubs. He did not pitch in 2018 due to injury and returned in 2019 to play for the Eugene Emeralds before suffering an injury which caused him to undergo Tommy John Surgery.

Estrada did not play a minor league game in 2020 due to the season being cancelled because of the COVID-19 pandemic. He returned in 2021 to pitch for the Myrtle Beach Pelicans. He started 2022 with the South Bend Cubs and was promoted to the Tennessee Smokies and Iowa Cubs during the season.

References

External links

1998 births
Living people
Arizona League Cubs players
Baseball players from California
Chicago Cubs players
Eugene Emeralds players
Iowa Cubs players
Major League Baseball pitchers
Myrtle Beach Pelicans players
People from Rancho Mirage, California
South Bend Cubs players
Tennessee Smokies players